Bobby Rice (also known as Bobby Quinn Rice; born Robert Quinn Rice; March 14, 1983) is an American actor, known for The Lair (2007), Watercolors (2008), Remains (2011), LAIFF Award winning short film Spidora (2014), the role of  Peter Kirk in the Star Trek: New Voyages two-part episode Blood and Fire (2009) based on the Star Trek: The Next Generation episode of the same name, as well as several minor roles in other Star Trek fan productions.

Filmography

Nominations

References

External links
Bobby Quinn Rice at Actors Access
Bobby Rice at IMDb
News item at TrekToday
Interview at BlogTalkRadio
News item at Los Angeles Times online
News coverage on Blood and Fire at Queerty*
Article on Blood and Fire at Ingenta Connect 
Article on Blood and Fire in Corona Magazine 
Article on Blood and Fire in Terrace, Vincent (2015), Internet Lesbian and Gay Television Series, 1996-2014

1983 births
Living people